"I Can't Be Bothered Now" is a song composed by George Gershwin, with lyrics by Ira Gershwin, written for the 1937 film A Damsel In Distress, where it was introduced by Fred Astaire.

Notable recordings 
Ella Fitzgerald - Ella Fitzgerald Sings the George and Ira Gershwin Songbook (1959)

References

Songs written for films
Songs with music by George Gershwin
Songs with lyrics by Ira Gershwin
Fred Astaire songs
Ella Fitzgerald songs
1937 songs